Makkasan Station is a rapid transit station on the Airport Rail Link. The station was opened in August 2010. City Air Terminal was the terminal station for the Airport Rail Link Express Line, which was suspended in September 2014 due to a shortage of rolling stock. Currently, the station is a stop on the Airport Rail Link City Line. Until September 2014, Thai Airways' City Air Terminal check-in facilities were located inside the station. 

The station has a skywalk, accessible by escalators and elevator, connecting it to Phetchaburi MRT Station, MRT Blue Line.

Former City Air Terminal 
Makkasan is the largest station on the Airport Rail Line connecting Suvarnabhumi Airport with downtown Bangkok. It was envisioned as a city air terminal where passengers could check into outgoing flights and connect to the public transportation network in Bangkok. In reality, the terminal was rarely used due to its inconvenient location and lack of connections to other public transportation. Access to the terminal was via one crowded road and when leaving the terminal traffic must go in a direction that makes getting to the popular Sukhumvit and Silom areas time-consuming and inconvenient.

Layout

Gallery

See also
 Makkasan Railway Station
 Suvarnabhumi Airport Link

References

External links 

 Airport Rail Link – Official Website (English)
 City Line Timetable – Makkasan Station (English)

Airport Rail Link (Bangkok) stations
Airport terminals
Bangkok rapid transit stations
Ratchathewi district